Bengaluru division is one of the four divisions of the Indian state Karnataka. The division comprises the districts of Bangalore Urban, Bangalore Rural, Chikkaballapur, Chitradurga, Davanagere, Kolar, Ramanagara, Shivamogga, and Tumakuru.The total area of the division is 49,936 sq.km. The total population as of 2011 census is 22,523,301, making it the world's fifth most populous sub-division.

See also
Bayalu Seeme
Cauvery Wildlife Sanctuary
Deccan Plateau
Deccan thorn scrub forests
Districts of Karnataka
South Karnataka

People
Kenneth Anderson (writer)
Major General Richard Stewart Dobbs

References

External links
 Regional Commissioner of Bengaluru Division

Divisions of Karnataka